Ambastaia nigrolineata is a vulnerable species of loach found in the Mekong basin in Southeast Asia and China. It occurs in clear, fast-flowing riffles and hillstreams with moderate currents and substrates composed primarily of sand. It is known to feed on insect larvae and other benthic organisms.

Ambastaia nigrolineata reaches 8 cm (3.1 inches) in standard length. It is sometimes seen in the aquarium trade, but it has historically been confused with the only other species in the genus, the similar A. sidthimunki.

References 

Freshwater fish of China
Fish of Laos
Fish of Thailand
Fish described in 1987